In 2007, there were over 5,000 Muslims residing in Puerto Rico, representing about 0.1% of the population. The early Muslim community largely consisted mainly of Palestinian and Jordanian immigrants who arrived between 1958 and 1962.  At the time, the vast majority of Puerto Rico's Muslims lived in Caguas – a city in the island's central region located south of San Juan – where they operated restaurants, jewelry stores and clothing outlets. A storefront mosque on Calle Padre Colón in the Río Piedras district of San Juan served the entire religious community on the island during earlier years, however, today there are mosques and Islamic centers in Aguadilla, Arecibo, Hatillo, Ponce, Vega Alta, and San Juan.  The American Muslim Association of North America (AMANA) also has an office in Cayey.

History 
Muslims first appeared in Puerto Rico in the 16th century when so-called Moriscos served as adventurers, traders, or enslaved laborers during the Spanish colonization of the Americas. Enslaved Muslims form West Africa were also transported to the island during the same period. Although the number of Muslims living in Puerto Rico was probably significant, these early communities didn't survive and were soon converted to Catholicism or other more syncretic African diasporic faiths.

Recently, there has been an increasing number of converts to Islam.

Notable mosques 
This is a list of notable mosques (Arabic: Masjid, Spanish: Mezquita) in Puerto Rico, including Islamic places of worship that do not qualify as traditional mosques.

Notable Puerto Rican Muslims 
Hector Camacho Jr., professional boxer

See also 
 Islam by country

References

External links 
 Muslim Students Association @ Polytechnic University of Puerto Rico
 A Database of Islamic Centers and Mosques in Puerto Rico